was a Japanese diver who competed in the 1936 Summer Olympics. In 1936 he finished sixth in the 3 metre springboard event as well as sixth in the 10 metre platform competition.

References

1916 births
1971 deaths
Japanese male divers
Olympic divers of Japan
Divers at the 1936 Summer Olympics
20th-century Japanese people